Cedric Harden (born October 19, 1974) is a former American football defensive end. He played for the San Diego Chargers in 1999 and for the Los Angeles Xtreme and Saskatchewan Roughriders in 2001.

References

1974 births
Living people
American football defensive ends
Florida A&M Rattlers football players
San Diego Chargers players
Amsterdam Admirals players
Los Angeles Xtreme players
Saskatchewan Roughriders players